Eleanor (1996) is a children's picture book biography of Eleanor Roosevelt's childhood, written by Barbara Cooney, describing her as a shy girl who goes on to do great things.

References

1996 children's books
Cultural depictions of Eleanor Roosevelt
Picture books by Barbara Cooney
American picture books
Children's history books